Hoganson is a surname. Notable people with the surname include:

Dale Hoganson (born 1949), Canadian ice hockey player
Michael Hoganson (born 1993), English footballer
Paul Hoganson (born 1949), Canadian ice hockey player
Kristin L. Hoganson, American historian

See also
Hogenson